Dmytro Mykhaylovych Fatyeyev (born 21 June 1994) is a Ukrainian professional football defender who plays for Livyi Bereh Kyiv.

Fatyeyev is a product of Youth Sportive School #2 in Kirovohrad. His first trainer was Vadym Bondar. After spending a short time in the Ukrainian Second League, he in 2012 signed a contract with his native city FC Zirka in the Ukrainian First League.

References

External links
 
 

1994 births
Living people
Sportspeople from Kropyvnytskyi
Ukrainian footballers
Association football defenders
FC Shakhtar-3 Donetsk players
FC Zirka Kropyvnytskyi players
FC Lviv players
FC Inhulets Petrove players
FC Kryvbas Kryvyi Rih players
FC Livyi Bereh Kyiv players
Ukrainian Premier League players
Ukrainian First League players